Wast Water or Wastwater is a lake located in Wasdale, a valley in the western part of the Lake District National Park, England. It is a glacial lake, formed in a glacially 'over-deepened' valley. It is owned by the National Trust.

Surroundings
The head of the Wasdale Valley is surrounded by some of the highest mountains in England, including Scafell Pike, Great Gable and Lingmell. The steep slopes on the southeastern side of the lake, leading up to the summits of Whin Rigg and Illgill Head, are known as the "Wastwater Screes" or on some maps as "The Screes". These screes formed as a result of ice and weathering erosion on the rocks of the Borrowdale Volcanic Group, that form the fells to the east of the lake, towards Eskdale.

A path runs the length of the lake, through the boulders and scree fall at the base of the craggy fell-side. On the northwestern side are the cliffs of Buckbarrow (a part of Seatallan) and the upturned-boat shape of Yewbarrow. Wast Water is the source of the River Irt which flows into the Irish Sea near Ravenglass.

Both the lake and Wasdale Screes are protected as Sites of Special Scientific Interest and under European Union law as Special Areas of Conservation.

Name origin and pronunciation
"Wastwater" comes from "Wasdale" plus English "water". " 'Wasdale lake' or 'the lake of Vatnsá, lake river'. The present name rather curiously contains the reflexes of both Old Norse 'vatn' 'water', 'lake', and Old English 'wæter' 'water', with the meaning 'lake' probably influenced by the Old Norse 'vatn'.

The valley is pronounced as in was, not with a hard a: the name of the lake similarly but with a soft "s" as in "thou wast". The lake is named "Wast Water" on Ordnance Survey maps but "Wastwater" is used with roughly equal frequency, including by its owner, the National Trust, along with the Cumbria Tourist Board, and the Lake District National Park Authority.

Points of interest

The Lady in the Lake
In 1976, The Wasdale Lady in the Lake, Margaret Hogg, was murdered by her husband and her body was disposed of in the lake. She was found after eight years, with her body preserved like wax due to the lack of oxygen in the water.

Underwater gnomes
In February 2005 it was reported that a "gnome garden" complete with picket fence had been placed in the lake as a point of interest for divers to explore. It was removed from the bottom of Wastwater after three divers died in the late 1990s. It is thought the divers spent too much time too deep searching for the ornaments. Police divers report a rumour that the garden had been replaced at a depth beyond the lowest the police were allowed to dive.

PC Kenny McMahon, a member of the North West Police Underwater Search Unit, said

Water extraction
Water was first pumped from the lake during World War II to supply the Royal Ordnance Factory at Drigg. It is pumped to the nearby Sellafield nuclear facility as an industrial water supply. The Nuclear Decommissioning Authority is allowed to extract from the lake a maximum of  a day to use on that site.

Favourite view
On 9 September 2007, Wast Water was announced as the winner of a vote to determine "Britain's Favourite View" by viewers of ITV.

Gallery

Tributaries
Clockwise from River Irt
Countess Beck
Smithy Beck
Goat Gill
Nether Beck
Over Beck
Mosedale Beck
Lingmell Beck
Hollow Gill
Straighthead Gill

In literature
In the book Goodbye, Mr. Chips, Mr Chipping meets his wife at Wasdale Head.

References

External links
The Wasdale Lady in the Lake
The Cumbria Directory - Wast Water

Lakes of the Lake District
Borough of Copeland
Underwater diving sites in England
Cumberland
Sites of Special Scientific Interest in Cumbria
Special Areas of Conservation in Cumbria
LWast